Hudson Valley Quickstrike Lady Blues was an American women’s soccer team, founded in 2006. The team was a member of the United Soccer Leagues W-League, the second tier of women’s soccer in the United States and Canada. The team played in the Northeast Division of the Eastern Conference. The team folded after the 2010 season

The team played its home games in the stadium on the campus of Newburgh Free Academy High School in the city of Newburgh, New York, 65 miles north of New York City. The club's colors was sky blue, dark blue, black and white.

The Lady Blues was part of the larger Sky Blue Soccer organization, based in Bedminster, New Jersey, an integrated program that allows players to progress in soccer from a young age with an opportunity for long-term growth. Prior to the 2009 season they were known as the Jersey Sky Blues.

Following the formation of Women's Professional Soccer in 2009, the team served as a feeder program for the New York/New Jersey franchise Sky Blue FC. The Sky Blue FC play at Yurcak Field on the campus of Rutgers University.

Players

Squad 2009

Notable former players
The following former players have played at the senior international and/or professional level:
  Kimberly Brandão
  Formiga
  Tobin Heath
  Nikki Krzysik
  Jillian Loyden
  Melissa Tancredi
  Lara Dickenmann

Year-by-year

Coaches
  Denise Reddy 2007–2008
  Jesse Kolmel 2008–present

Stadium
 Ranger Stadium, Madison, New Jersey 2008–present

References

External links
Official Site

   

Women's soccer clubs in the United States
Soccer clubs in New Jersey
Defunct USL W-League (1995–2015) teams
2006 establishments in New Jersey
2010 disestablishments in New York (state)
Women's sports in New Jersey